The Milli Yakjehti Council (MYC, also called the National Alliance for Religious Harmony) is a Pakistani non-political alliance of political and non-political religious parties  formed in 1995 on the advise of Maulana Naeem Siddiqui(the founder of tehreek e islami) to unite  religious parties and reduce sectarian tensions in the nation.

In 1996, the MYC adopted a resolution objecting to a planned Pakistan nuclear treaty, and calling for a nuclear device to be tested.

In 2012, the party was described as "recently revived", and elected former Jamiat-i-Islami chief Qazi Hussain Ahmed as president.

References

Political parties in Pakistan
Political parties established in 1995
1995 establishments in Pakistan